Burial Act is a stock short title used in the United Kingdom for legislation relating to burials.

List
Burying in Woollen Acts
The Burial of Drowned Persons Acts 1808 and 1886

The Burial Acts 1852 to 1885 is the collective title of the following Acts:
The Burial Act 1852 (15 & 16 Vict c 85)
The Burial Act 1853 (16 & 17 Vict c 134)
The Burial Act 1854 (17 & 18 Vict c 87)
The Burial Act 1855 (18 & 19 Vict c 128)
The City of London Burial Act 1857 (20 & 21 Vict c 35)
The Burial Act 1857 (20 & 21 Vict c 81)
The Burial Act 1859 (22 Vict c 1)
The Burial Act 1860 (23 & 24 Vict c 64)
The Burial Act 1862 (25 & 26 Vict c 100)
The Burial Act 1871 (34 & 35 Vict c 33)
The Burial Laws Amendment Act 1880 (43 & 44 Vict c 41)
The Burial and Registration Acts (Doubts Removal) Act 1881 (44 & 45 Vict c 2)
The Burial Boards (Contested Elections) Act 1885 (48 & 49 Vict c 21)

The Burial (Ireland) Acts 1824 to 1868 is the collective title of the following Acts:
The Burial (Ireland) Act 1824 (5 Geo 4 c 25)
The Poor Persons Burial (Ireland) Act 1866 (29 & 30 Vict c 38)
The Burial (Ireland) Act 1868 (31 & 32 Vict c 103)

The Burial Grounds (Scotland) Acts 1855 to 1886 was the collective title of the following Acts:
The Burial Grounds (Scotland) Act 1855 (18 & 19 Vict c 68)
The Burial Grounds (Scotland) Act 1857 (20 & 21 Vict c 42)
The Burial Grounds (Scotland) Amendment Act 1886 (49 & 50 Vict c 21)

See also
List of short titles

References

Lists of legislation by short title and collective title
Legal aspects of death